Teresa Miller is a former Secretary of the Pennsylvania Department of Human Services. She was previously the Insurance Commissioner of Pennsylvania, having been nominated by Pennsylvania Governor Tom Wolf and confirmed in June 2015. Previously, she served as administrator of the Oregon Insurance Division. She is a member of the National Association of Insurance Commissioners (NAIC).

Miller received her undergraduate degree from Pacific Lutheran University has a law degree from Willamette University.  She was the administrator of the Oregon Insurance Division.  She then worked for the Centers for Medicare and Medicaid Services, at the U.S. Department of Health and Human Services  and then became a partner at the law firm of Crowell & Moring.

Miller announced her departure from the administration effective April 30, 2021.

References

Living people
State cabinet secretaries of Pennsylvania
State insurance commissioners of the United States
Pacific Lutheran University alumni
Willamette University College of Law alumni
Year of birth missing (living people)